Antrodia albida is a species of fungus in the genus Antrodia that grows on the dead wood of deciduous trees. A widely distributed species, it is found in Africa, Asia, Europe, Oceania, North America, and South America. The fungus was first described under the name Daedalea albida by Elias Magnus Fries in his 1815 work . Marinus Anton Donk transferred it to Antrodia in 1960.

References

Fungi described in 1815
Fungi of Africa
Fungi of Asia
Fungi of Europe
Fungi of Oceania
Fungi of North America
Fungi of South America
Fungal plant pathogens and diseases
Fomitopsidaceae
Taxa named by Elias Magnus Fries
Fungi without expected TNC conservation status